FC Kilia Kiel is a German association football club from the city of Kiel, Schleswig-Holstein.

History
The club was formed 23 July 1902 by a group of footballers who had left 1. Kieler Fußballverein von 1900 which plays today as Holstein Kiel. Through the 1920s the club played in the Nordkreisliga where it was competitive enough to earn second-place finishes behind Holstein in 1922, 1923 and 1924. The next season the Kreisliga was split into two sections; the Fördestaffel and the Eiderstaffel, with Holstein playing in the former and Kilia the latter. This did not change the club's fortunes, however, as Kilia was unable to overtake its rival and make it out of regional league play to the national level.

The club played lower-tier football over the next decades until winning promotion in 1941 to the Gauliga Nordmark, one of sixteen top-flight divisions formed in the 1933 re-organization of German football under the Third Reich. The following season this division was also split up to form the Gauliga Hamburg and the Gauliga Schleswig-Holstein – where Kilia again finished second-best to Holstein.

World War II eventually forced the club to join Union Teutonia Kiel to form the war time side (Kriegsspielgemeinshaft) KSG Kilia Kiel/Union Teutonia Kiel. Play in the division became local in character, centered on the cities of Kiel and Lübeck. Conflict overtook the region and therefore league results are unknown for the 1944–45 season.

After the war Kilia resumed play in the second tier Landesliga Schleswig-Holstein where they played through to 1962 without distinguishing themselves. After the formation of the Bundesliga, Germany's first top flight professional league in 1963, and the subsequent re-organization of the lower divisions, Kilia found itself in what was now the third tier Amateurliga Schleswig-Holstein. They took part in promotion playoffs for the Regionalliga Nord (II) at the end of the 1964 season, but were unsuccessful in their bid to move up. By 1966 they had slipped to fourth division play in the 2.Amateurliga Schleswig-Holstein/Ost and Verbandsliga Schleswig-Holstein/Nord until a further descent to the Landesliga Schleswig-Holstein/Nord (V) in 1981.

A first place Landesliga finish in 1984 returned Kilia to the Verbandsliga Schleswig-Holstein for a ten-year span until re-structuring made the league a fifth division circuit. After a single season cameo in the Oberliga Hamburg/Schleswig-Holstein (IV) in 2001–02, Kilia voluntarily returned to the Verbandsliga.

The club dropped to the tier seven Kreisliga but was promoted back up to the Verbandsliga Schleswig-Holstein-Nord-Ost in 2014 and to the Schleswig-Holstein-Liga in 2015.

Honours
The club's honours:
 Verbandsliga Schleswig-Holstein-Nord-Ost: 2015
 Schleswig-Holstein Cup: 1990, 1993

External links

Abseits Guide to German Soccer
Das deutsche Fußball-Archiv historical German football league tables (in German)

Football clubs in Germany
Football clubs in Schleswig-Holstein
Sport in Kiel
Association football clubs established in 1902
1902 establishments in Germany